Prisci Latini (or Prisci et Latini) may refer to:
 Aborigines (mythology) in Roman mythology
 Albani people from the ancient city Alba Longa

See also
 Latins (Italic tribe), an Italic tribe which included the early inhabitants of the city of Rome